Verzuolo Castle is a medieval castle in the Piedmont region of Italy, near Verzuolo, Province of Cuneo.

History 
The castle was originally built in the 11th century and was modified in its original structure by order of Frederick II in 1377. The successors of Frederick II continued modifying the structure of the building, turning it into the main fortress of the Marquisate of Saluzzo.

In 1528, Giovanni Ludovico, Marquess of Saluzzo, was imprisoned in the castle.

In 1600 the castle facade was renovated, changing its aspect from that of a military fortress to that of a luxury mansion, and it has since been used as a summer residence of illustrious personalities, including Charles Emmanuel I, Duke of Savoy, and Giambattista Bodoni.

On 18 June 1916, valuable documents referring to the history of Piedmont were lost in the collapse of one of the castle's two towers.

Venerdì 8 giugno 2022, l'ufficialità della vendita del Castello di Verzuolo alla Om.e.g Srl, società attiva nei settori del real estate, dell’energia e delle fonti rinnovabili. Le attività di riqualificazione del complesso, sarebbero già iniziate: in fase di studio ci sarebbe un progetto per rendere il maniero una struttura legata al benessere e all’ospitalità, in modo da favorire lo sviluppo turistico del territorio.

References

External links 
www.comune.verzuolo.cn.it

Buildings and structures in the Province of Cuneo
Castles in Piedmont
Gothic art
Tourist attractions in Piedmont
Verzuolo